An insect growth regulator (IGR) is a substance (chemical) that inhibits the life cycle of an insect. IGRs are typically used as insecticides to control populations of harmful insect pests such as cockroaches and fleas.

Advantages
Many IGRs are labeled "reduced risk" by the Environmental Protection Agency, meaning that they target juvenile harmful insect populations while causing less detrimental effects to beneficial insects. Many beekeepers have reported IGR's negatively  affecting brood and young bees. Unlike classic insecticides, IGRs do not affect an insect's nervous system and are thus more friendly to "worker insects" within closed environments. IGRs are also more compatible with pest management systems that use biological controls. In addition, while insects can become resistant to insecticides, they are less likely to become resistant to IGRs.

Mechanism of action

As an insect grows it molts, growing a new exoskeleton under its old one and then shedding the old one to allow the new one to swell to a new size and harden.
IGRs prevent an insect from reaching maturity by interfering with the molting process. This in turn curbs infestations because immature insects cannot reproduce. Because these IGRs work by interfering with an insect's molting process, they kill insects more slowly than traditional insecticides. Death typically occurs within 3 to 10 days, depending on the IGR product, the insect's life stage at the time the product is applied, and how quickly the insect develops. Some IGRs cause insects to stop feeding long before they die.

Hormonal IGRs
Hormonal IGRs typically work by mimicking or inhibiting the juvenile hormone (JH), one of the two major hormones involved in insect molting. IGRs can also inhibit the other hormone, ecdysone, large peaks of which trigger the insect to molt. If JH is present at the time of molting, the insect molts into a larger larval form; if absent, it molts into a pupa or adult.
IGRs that mimic JH can produce premature molting of young immature stages, disrupting larval development. They can also act on eggs, causing sterility, disrupting behavior or disrupting diapause, the process that causes an insect to become dormant before winter.
IGRs that inhibit JH production can cause insects to prematurely molt into a nonfunctional adult.
IGRs that inhibit ecdysone can cause pupal mortality by interrupting the transformation of larval tissues into adult tissues during the pupal stage.

Chitin synthesis inhibitors
Chitin synthesis inhibitors work by preventing the formation of chitin, a carbohydrate needed to form the insect's exoskeleton. With these inhibitors, an insect grows normally until it molts. The inhibitors prevent the new exoskeleton from forming properly, causing the insect to die. Death may be quick, or take up to several days depending on the insect. Chitin synthesis inhibitors can also kill eggs by disrupting normal embryonic development. Chitin synthesis inhibitors affect insects for longer periods of time than hormonal IGRs. These are also quicker acting but can affect predaceous insects, arthropods and even fish. Compounds include benzoylurea pesticides.

Examples

Chitin synthesis inhibitors 
Diflubenzuron (Vigilante), a benzoylurea
Triflumuron (Starycide), another benzoylurea

Juvenoids
Juvenoids are juvenile hormone mimics, also known as juvenile hormone analogs:
Fenoxycarb (Varikill, Insegar, Logic)
Hydroprene (Gentrol)
Methoprene (Precor)
Pyriproxyfen (Nyguard, Nylar, Sumilarv)

Others 
Azadirachtin (AzaGuard) – 20E and JH antagonist, among other, non-growth-related actions

References

Insecticides